The Harbin SH-5 (where "水轰" is short for ) is a Chinese maritime patrol amphibious aircraft intended for a wide range of duties, including aerial firefighting, anti-submarine warfare (ASW) and air-sea rescue (ASR).  One prototype and six production aircraft have been built.

Design and development
Research to build a seaplane capable of replacing Beriev Be-6s in service was initiated by the PLANAF in 1968, with designers reassigned from "Objective 3/17", a supersonic canard-wing fighter project. The first prototype flew in 1976; further units were delivered between 1986 and 1990.

Variants

SH-5B Firefighter
One SH-5 was rebuilt for firefighting duties.

However, by Chinese source, there were total of 7 SH-5 were produced: 3 SH-5X Prototype, 3 Maritime patrol aircraft, and 1 SH-B Firefighter.

Operators

 People's Liberation Army Naval Air Force received 4 aircraft in 1986. All are operated by the People's Liberation Army Navy North Sea Fleet from an aircraft base near Qingdao, Shandong province.

Specifications (SH-5)

See also

References

Notes

Bibliography
 
 
 The Harbin SH-5
 某型水上飞机水动力性能数值验证研究
  PS-5 / SH-5 - Shuishang Hongzhaji (Maritime Bomber)
 SH-5 Amphibious Aircraft, Chinese Defence Today

SH-5
1980s Chinese military aircraft
Flying boats
Amphibious aircraft
Four-engined tractor aircraft
Four-engined turboprop aircraft
High-wing aircraft
Aerial firefighting aircraft
Aircraft first flown in 1976
Twin-tail aircraft